Maximilian Barreiro (Mendoza, Argentina, 16 March 1985) is an Argentine forward.

References

External links
 
 

1985 births
Living people
Argentine footballers
Argentine expatriate footballers
Uruguayan Primera División players
Liga MX players
Ecuadorian Serie A players
Categoría Primera A players
San Martín de San Juan footballers
Atlético Tucumán footballers
Mushuc Runa S.C. footballers
Defensor Sporting players
Delfín S.C. footballers
Club Necaxa footballers
C.S.D. Independiente del Valle footballers
Atlético Huila footballers
S.D. Aucas footballers
Expatriate footballers in Ecuador
Expatriate footballers in Uruguay
Expatriate footballers in Mexico
Expatriate footballers in Colombia
Association football forwards
Sportspeople from Mendoza Province